Travin is a surname. Notable people with the surname include:

 Aleksandr Travin (1937–1989), Soviet Olympic basketball player
 Andrei Travin (b. 1979), Kazakh association football player
 Gleb Travin (1902–1979), Russian cyclist

Russian-language surnames